Arun Kumar Purwar, also known as A. K. Purwar, became the Chairman of State Bank of India in 2002, during his tenure from 1968 to 2006.

With a master's degree in commerce from Allahabad University, he was previously a lecturer in their Business Administration Department.

He also chairs the Federation of Indian Chambers of Commerce and Industry (FICCI) Diaspora Division.

His profile has a plethora of key financial positions which can be viewed at Zauba Corp.

References

External links
Bio on the FICCI site
FICCI Diaspora Division
Profile at Zauba Corp.

20th-century Indian economists
University of Allahabad alumni
Living people
State Bank of India
Chairmen of the State Bank of India
Year of birth missing (living people)